Sao Edward Yang Kyein Sai, Saopha of Kokang (1918–1971, at Lashio) was the traditional ruler (saopha) of the Burmese state of Kokang from 1949, at the death of his father, saopha Sao Yang Wen Pin, until he abdicated in 1959.

Yang's sister, Olive Yang, was a prominent opium warlord, recruited by Khin Nyunt in the late 1980s to help broker ceasefires in Burma with ethnic rebel groups.

References

Burmese royalty
Burmese people of Chinese descent
Monarchs who abdicated